A. K. M. Jahangir Khan (21 April 1939 – 15 February 2020) was a Bangladeshi film producer who produced 43 films. He was known by the name of "Movie Mughal".

Biography
Khan was born on 21 April 1939 in  Chouddagram of Comilla. He completed matriculation from Dhaka Collegiate School. Later, he completed higher secondary and post graduate studies from Jagannath College in 1960 and 1962 respectively.

Khan produced films under the banner of his own production company named Alamgir Pictures. He produced films like Noyonmoni, Ki Je Kori, Simana Periye, Chandranath and  Shuvoda. Noyonmoni won National Film Awards in two categories, Ki Je Kori won National Film Awards in one category, Simana Periye won National Film Awards in four categories, Chandranath won National Film Awards in four categories and Shuvoda won National Film Awards in thirteen categories. He was given the title "Movie Mughal" by Ahmed Zaman Chowdhury in 1978. His last film Rongin Noyonmoni was released in 1998.

Khan died on 15 February 2020 at United Hospital in Dhaka at the age of 80. He is survived by two sons and a daughter; the latter is the well-known Bangladeshi singer Jhumu Khan.

Selected filmography
 Noyonmoni
 Tufan
 Badol
 Kudrot
 Rajsinghason
 Saodagor
 Vijayini Sonavan
 Rooper Rani Chorer Raja
 Rajkanya
 Surjo Konna
 Ki Je Kori
 Simana Periye
 Chandranath
 Shuvoda
 Rongin Rupban
 Rongin Kanchonmala
 Ali Baba Chollish Chor
 Altabanu
 Disco Dancer
 Padmabati
 Somrat
 Tin Bahadur
 Daku Morzina
 Sonai Bandhu
 Rangin Rakhalbandhu
 Ma
 Babar Adesh
 Prem Diwana
 Rongin Noyonmoni
 Kanya
 Shirshamahal
 Amar Ma

References

1939 births
2020 deaths
Bangladeshi film producers
People from Comilla District